Atlantis (also titled Atlantis: End of a World, Birth of a Legend) is a 2011 BBC docudrama which depicts a re-enactment of the events surrounding the volcanic eruption which destroyed the island of Thera, an incident believed to have inspired the legend of Atlantis. The hour-long programme is based on the work of leading scientists, archaeologists and historians, and featured Stephanie Leonidas and Reece Ritchie as members of the Bronze Age civilization. The film was narrated by Tom Conti, and made its debut on BBC One on Sunday 8 May 2011.

Synopsis

With voiceover from Tom Conti, the film tells the story of Yishharu, an apprentice bull-leaper who has recently returned to Thera from Crete with his new wife, Pinaruti. They discover that Thera is beset by earthquakes and volcanic activity. Over the course of the story, the volcano erupts, throwing out ash and molten lava, and destroying the island with pyroclastic flows. Although the couple survive the first stages of the disaster they are separated after Yishharu is left behind when Pinaruti and other islanders escape by boat. The nearby island of Crete is then engulfed by a giant tsunami which was triggered by the eruption, and Pinaruti is washed up on the shore of a nearby island.

Cast

Narrator - Tom Conti
Pinaruti - Stephanie Leonidas
Yishharu - Reece Ritchie
Rusa - Langley Kirkwood
Bansabira - Isadora Verwey
Ariad - Natalie Becker
Yidini - Tony Caprari

Reception

Reception from critics was generally negative, particularly for the hammy acting and silly dialogue.

Zoe Williams, writing for The Guardian said: "The heavy-handed doomsday lighting made it look like the build-up to a joke on a Pot Noodle ad. The dialogue sounded like Holby City...The more dramatic the narration tried to be, the more mundane it sounded...The truth, I think, is that someone somewhere was looking for the new Pompeii, because we've all heard that one, and decided this was it: the second-best ancient disaster status clung doggedly to the project. An equally unfavourable review in The Independent suggested: "The final explosion has been calculated to have been 40,000 times more powerful than the Hiroshima bomb, and it would have been a great mercy if it had occurred 50 minutes earlier in Atlantis. That would have given us the bull-jumping – which was rather excitingly filmed – and spared us the catastrophe that followed."

References

External links
Atlantis at BBC Online
 

2011 television films
2011 films
BBC television docudramas
British television films
Films set in Greece
BBC television documentaries about prehistoric and ancient history
2010s British films